Turaida is a part of Sigulda in the Vidzeme Region of Latvia. Its most famous site is the Brick Gothic Turaida Castle.

In 1212, a peace treaty was signed in Turaida between the Estonian tribes and the Livonian Brothers of the Sword, the Archbishopric of Riga, the Livonians and the Latgalians.

External links
Turaida website
Turaida castle website

Villages in Latvia